Double Check is a 1982 sculpture by John Seward Johnson II, located across from Zuccotti Park at the corner of Liberty Street and Broadway in Manhattan, New York City.  The bronze sculpture portrays a well-dressed businessman sitting with his briefcase open, which are filled with office materials getting ready to enter a office building. The statue is notable for its association with the 9/11 attacks.

History 
The sculpture was installed before the September 11 attacks serving as a art piece. However, after the attack, it became a memorial site, with people leaving flowers, notes, and candles. Photos were taken where the sculpture was covered in ash after the attack with it suffering minor damage. It was moved multiple times and was moved for the final time across from Zuccotti Park (then Liberty Park). The statue was removed to be cleaned and was returned to its original place in June 1, 2006.

In 2018, the statue was relocated to the northwest corner of Broadway and Liberty.

Selected quotes

See also

 1982 in art

References

Note

Citations

External links
 Art on Sight: The Best Art Walks In and Near New York City by Lucy D. Rosenfeld and Marina Harrison (2013)
 Grounds for Sculpture opens Seward Johnson exhibit that's larger than life by Dan Bischoff, The Star-Ledger (2014)
 Seward Johnson, the founder of "Grounds for Sculpture" A blog that has photos of Double Check after 9/11

1982 establishments in New York City
1982 sculptures
Financial District, Manhattan
Outdoor sculptures in Manhattan
Sculptures by John Seward Johnson II
Statues in New York City